The Habsburg class was a group of pre-dreadnought battleships built by Austria-Hungary at the turn of the 20th century. They were the first sea-going battleship built by Austria-Hungary since the central battery ship  in 1876. Habsburg and Árpád were modernized in 1910–11.

Habsburg was launched on 9 September 1900, Árpád just over a year later on 11 September 1901, and Babenberg on 4 October 1902. The ships saw limited service during World War I in the IV Division of the Austro-Hungarian fleet. Babenberg and Árpád bombarded the Italian port of Ancona in 1915, but the three battleships were largely inactive for the remainder of their service. They were decommissioned in 1916 to free up the majority of their crews for service in the submarine and air forces. All three ships were ultimately ceded to Great Britain following the end of the war; they were sold to Italian ship-breakers and scrapped in 1921.

Design

General characteristics and machinery 

The ships of the Habsburg class were 113.11 m (371 ft) long at the waterline and 114.55 m (375 ft 10 in) long overall. They had a beam of 19.8 m (65 ft) and a draft of 7.5 m (24 ft 6 in). Freeboard was approximately  forward and about  aft. They displaced  . The ships had a crew of 638 officers and enlisted men. The ships had a flush main deck that was planked with wood, while the upper decks were covered with linoleum or corticine.

The hulls for each ship were constructed from transverse and longitudinal steel frames, over which the outer hull plates were riveted. The hull incorporated a double bottom that ran for 63% of its length. A series of watertight bulkheads extended from the keel to the gun deck; there were a total of 174 watertight compartments in each ship. Bilge keels were mounted on either side of the hull to reduce rolling.

Their machinery system consisted of 2-shaft 4-cylinder vertical triple expansion engines. They were supplied with steam by 16 Belleville boilers.

Armament 

The ships' primary armament was three  L/40 guns, with two mounted in a twin turret forward and one mounted in a single turret aft of the main superstructure. The guns were manufactured by Krupp in Germany, and were the C 97 type.

Secondary armament included twelve  SK L/40 guns in casemates. They were mounted in an unusual arrangement: there were two decks of three guns each on either side amidships. These guns could fire armor-piercing shells at a rate of 4–5 per minute. They were manually elevated and trained.

The ships carried a wide array of smaller weapons, for defense against torpedo boats. These included ten  L/45 guns, six  L/44 quick-firing (QF) guns, and two  L/33 QF guns. All of these guns were emplaced in single mounts, either on the upper decks and superstructure, or in casemates at the bow and stern. With the exception of the main battery 24 cm weapons, all of the guns carried on the ships were manufactured by Škoda Works in Pilsen. The ships also carried two Whitehead  submerged torpedo tubes.

Armor 

Habsburg and her sisters were protected by face-hardened chrome-nickel steel. The belt was widened at the bow to cover the ram.

Its sides were 100 mm thick, and its communication tube was only 50 mm thick.

Construction 

Habsburg was laid down at the Stabilimento Tecnico Triestino shipyard in Trieste on 13 March 1899. She was launched on 9 September 1900, after which fitting-out work was conducted. The ship was finally finished by December 1902; she was commissioned into the Austro-Hungarian fleet on the 31st of that month. Árpád followed Habsburg three months later; she was laid down at the STT shipyard on 10 June 1899 and launched on 11 September 1901. She was commissioned into the fleet on 15 June 1903. Babenberg, the last ship of the three, was laid down at the STT dockyard on 19 January 1901. She was launched on 4 October 1902 and completed on 15 April 1904, when she joined her sisters in the fleet.

Ships

Service history

Peacetime 

Habsburg and Árpád took part in their first fleet maneuvers in mid 1903. By the following summer, Babenberg was ready for active service, and she too participated in fleet drills. During the 1904 training exercises, the three Habsburgs engaged the three  battleships in simulated combat; the maneuver marked the first time two homogeneous squadrons consisting of modern battleships operated in the Austro-Hungarian navy. The three Habsburg-class ships formed the I Division while the Monarchs formed the II Division. The ships were also active in the Mediterranean. Habsburg conducted a training cruise with the three Monarch-class battleships in January 1903. She was joined by Árpád the following year. With the commissioning of the s in 1906–1907, the three Habsburg-class ships were transferred to the II Division, and the three Monarchs went to the III Division.

World War I 

At the outbreak of World War I in late July 1914, Habsburg was serving as the flagship of the III Battleship Division of the Austro-Hungarian fleet, under the command of Captain Miklós Horthy, alongside her two sisters. They were later transferred to the IV Division after the new s came into service. The two German ships were stationed in the Mediterranean and were attempting to break out of the strait of Messina, which was surrounded by British troops and vessels and make their way to Turkey. After the Germans successfully broke out of Messina, the navy was recalled. The fleet had by that time advanced as far south as Brindisi in south eastern Italy. After Italy entered the war on the side of France and England, the Austro-Hungarian navy bombarded several Italian installations; Babenberg took part in the attack on Ancona in 1915.

They were later decommissioned and served as harbor defense ships for the latter portion of the conflict. Their crews were then transferred to man new U-boats and aircraft. By 1918, Árpád was converted into a training ship. Following the end of the war, the ships were awarded to Great Britain as war prizes, but were instead sold and broken up for scrapping in Italy in 1921.

Footnotes

References 

Battleship classes
World War I battleships of Austria-Hungary